The 1902–03 WPHL season was the sixth season of operation for the Western Pennsylvania Hockey League. This was the first season whereby the league and its teams were recognized as professional, making it the first professional ice hockey league. To fill their team the Pittsburgh Athletic Club lured players from Canada with promises of high-paid employment and small cash incentives, which was around $30 a week.

Four Pittsburgh-area teams competed in the season, in which all games were played at the Duquesne Gardens. The Pittsburgh Victorias were added to the WPHL making it a four team league. The team was made up of players from Ottawa, that were enticed to come to Pittsburgh. The Victorias were able to add Stanley Cup winner Bruce Stuart to their team, giving the future Hall of Famer his start in professional hockey. That season, Stuart led the WPHL with 16 goals in his first pro season and was named to the First All-Star team.  The season concluded with the Pittsburgh Bankers having the best record in the league and being named league champions. It would be the team's first league title.

Final standings

References

 

Western Pennsylvania Hockey League seasons
WPHL